Buchaechum (부채춤), called fan dance, is a Korean fan dance originating from various traditional and religious Korean dances. It is usually performed by groups of female dancers.

History
Buchaechum was created in 1954 by dancer Kim Baek-bong, who drew influences from both Korean shamanic ritual dances and traditional Joseon court and folk dances.

Koreans embrace Korean heritage and culture through the arts, specifically through dance. The Buchaechum, which can also be referred to as Korean fan dancing, is a traditional, beautiful way to represent Korean culture while embracing minority empowerment, (Lim, 2015). As Buchaechums display beautiful traditional Korean clothing, and colorful Korean fans, at the same time, Buchaechums also represent family, school, and Korean communities being able to come together as well as appreciating minority empowerment. The Korean fan dance may used to have a more traditional setting; there has been an increase in change of the setting, performers, and audience of a traditional Buchaechum, (Kim, Crump, 1993).

Performances
This dance is performed at many celebrations and events in Korea, and has become popular worldwide. Dancers use large fans painted with pink peony blossoms to create various formations that represent images such as birds, flowers, butterflies, dragons and waves. The dancers wear brightly coloured hanbok, the Korean traditional dress. 

Buchaechum is usually performed with minyo (folk song) or sanjo (instrumental solo) accompaniment, though court and ritual music is often used as well. The dance is known for showcasing the elegant and graceful aspects of classical technique in a format suitable for modern audiences. 

Not only does performing Buchaechum show true Korean elegance, it also allows the audience to appreciate Korean culture, especially Korean fan dancing. This allows audiences to visually remember and take in how beautiful and calming the fan dance is, all with remembering sounds of the Korean drums played as well. Buchaechum allows individuals of other countries to celebrate Korean culture, and to celebrate multiculturalism. Not only are Buchaechums performed in Korean culture, but are celebrated in other countries such as Japan and the importance of dance in expressing identity. The Buchaechum shows grace and elegance while helping others understand the importance of being viewed to more of a modern audience. Various countries have been appreciating and understanding the importance of the Buchaechum, much more than in the past. 
In Japan, many Korean cultural events took place to show their respect and allow Korean arts to stand out to others. In Japan, special events such as fairs or Korean festivals were created to help express diversity not only within the Asian community, but specifically the Korean culture. Buchaechums were one of many Korean events which took place in public areas, such as parks, schools, or community recreation centers. Participants in the Korean fan dance, which included mainly girls, hold bright colored fans as they dance to drums being played in the background.  Japanese schools helped create these events to show more appreciation of traditional Korean arts. While the country of Japan housed many Korean students, schools in Japan acknowledged the lack of funding in the Korean community education system. Japanese schools also did this to show how Japanese educators who may not respect or acknowledge Korean culture appreciate Korean dance more, especially when a lot of their students participate in the Buchaechum, (Lim, 2015). The performance of the Buchaechum of Koreans living in Japan helps Korean students’ parents also realize the importance of their own culture. Korean adults who have lived in Japan with children may lose touch of their Korean culture, as they adapted to Japanese culture and customs.

See also

Korean dance
Korean culture
Korean fighting fan

References 

Korean dance
Group dances
Ventilation fans